Lucius Cary may refer to one of several members of the Cary family who held the title Viscount Falkland:

Lucius Cary, 2nd Viscount Falkland (1610–1643)
Lucius Cary, 3rd Viscount Falkland (1632–1649)
Lucius Cary, 6th Viscount Falkland (1687–1730)
Lucius Cary, 7th Viscount Falkland (c. 1707–1785)
Lucius Cary, 10th Viscount Falkland (1803–1884)
Lucius Cary, 13th Viscount Falkland (1880–1961)
Lucius Cary, 14th Viscount Falkland (1905–1984)
Lucius Cary, 15th Viscount Falkland (born 1935)
 Lucius Cary, Master of Falkland (born 1963)

Lucius Cary (British Army officer) (1735–1780) son of 7th Viscount and MP for Bridport